A Zenith number was a special type of telephony service that allowed a calling party to call the number's owner at no charge by requesting the call from a switchboard operator and citing the "Zenith", "Enterprise" or "WX" number. The service preceded the system of toll-free telephone numbers with area code 800 in the United States.

Introduced in the 1930s, a Zenith number was listed in local directories in each community from which a business desired to receive calls. In that era, direct-dial numbers were commonly published with telephone exchange names followed by digits, such as in the telephone number "PEnnsylvania 6-5000". The letter Z appeared on many telephone dials from the early 1930s to the early 1950s at the same position as the label Operator, indicating that the caller had to call the operator to place the call. The operator looked up the Zenith number (typically in a paper book kept at the switchboard) to find the regular number and city corresponding to it, and completed the call as if it were a collect call to the destination number.

For organizations having limited access from specific areas, a Zenith number could provide savings over using foreign exchange (FX) service. For example, if a bus company had to provide a bus information number for callers in a distant area from its main office, and a Zenith number cost $6 a month plus about $1.50 per call, and an FX number cost $50 a month, until the Zenith number regularly received at least 30 calls or more a month, it would be cheaper than establishing foreign exchange service.

In the United States and Canada, usage of manual Zenith numbers diminished after the 1967 introduction of interstate direct-dial 800 area code InWATS toll-free service, and especially after the requirement that 800 calls be placed via special fixed-rate trunks ended in 1982. A similar service in the United Kingdom, in which callers asked operators for "Freephone (name or number)", had no direct-dial counterpart until 1985.

As direct-dial toll-free service declined in cost, Zenith numbers nearly disappeared; telephone companies in most service areas are no longer assigning new Zenith numbers.

A few organizations continue to keep their Zenith numbers. For example, the California Highway Patrol continues to use its decades-old Zenith 1-2000, though it advertises 1-800-TELL-CHP on its website.

Examples
 Ontario Provincial Police Detachment Search - Zenith 50000
 Ambulance Dispatchers - Ontario Zenith 80000

References

Telephone numbers